Anoma is a genus of gastropods belonging to the family Urocoptidae.

The species of this genus are found in America.

Species

Species:

Anoma adamsi 
Anoma alboanfractus 
Anoma dohrniana 
Anoma flexuosa 
Anoma fuscolabris 
Anoma gossei 
Anoma gracilis 
Anoma integra 
Anoma jarvisi  
Anoma levis 
Anoma nigrescens 
Anoma nitens 
Anoma prunicolor 
Anoma pulchella 
Anoma pulla 
Anoma radiata 
Anoma sinuata 
Anoma solida 
Anoma splendens 
Anoma striata 
Anoma tesselata 
Anoma tricolor 
Anoma virginea

References

Urocoptidae
Gastropod genera